Mendankwe and Nkwen are distinct dialects of a Grassfields Bantu language spoken in Cameroon.

References

Ngemba languages
Languages of Cameroon